Lotka's law, named after Alfred J. Lotka, is one of a variety of special applications of Zipf's law.  It describes the frequency of publication by authors in any given field. It states that the number of authors making    contributions in a given period is a fraction of the number making a single contribution, following the formula    where  nearly always equals two, i.e., an approximate inverse-square law, where the number of authors publishing a certain number of articles is a fixed ratio to the number of authors publishing a single article.  As the number of articles published increases, authors producing that many publications become less frequent.  There are 1/4 as many authors publishing two articles within a specified time period as there are single-publication authors, 1/9 as many publishing three articles, 1/16 as many publishing four articles, etc.  Though the law itself covers many disciplines, the actual ratios involved (as a function of 'a') are discipline-specific.

The general formula says:

or

Example 

Say 100 authors write at least one article each over a specific period. We assume for this table that C=100 and n=2. Then the number of authors writing portions of any particular articles in that time period is described as in the following table:

That would be a total of 294 articles with 155 writers with an average of 1.9 articles for each writer.

This is an empirical observation rather than a necessary result.  This form of the law is as originally published and is sometimes referred to as the "discrete Lotka power function".

Software 
 Friedman, A. 2015. "The Power of Lotka’s Law Through the Eyes of R" The Romanian Statistical Review. Published by National Institute of Statistics. 
  - Software to fit a Lotka power law distribution to observed frequency data.

See also
 Price's law

References

Further reading 
  — Chung and Cox analyze a bibliometric regularity in finance literature, relating Lotka's law to the maxim that "the rich get richer and the poor get poorer", and equating it to the maxim that "success breeds success".

External links

The Journal of the Washington Academy of Sciences, vol. 16

Bibliometrics
Statistical laws